Lawrence "Sonny" Homer (born July 8, 1936, in Trail, British Columbia – February 22, 2006) was a professional Canadian football wide receiver who played eleven seasons in the Canadian Football League for the BC Lions. He was part of the Lions' 1964 Grey Cup victory, his best season when he caught 50 passes for 776 yards (15.5 yards/catch average). He totalled 217 catches in his career for 3,765 yards (17.4 yards/catch average).

Homer played with only one kidney. He died on February 22, 2006, in North Vancouver, British Columbia.

References

External links 
Lionbackers message board on his death

1936 births
2006 deaths
Sportspeople from Trail, British Columbia
Players of Canadian football from British Columbia
Canadian football wide receivers
BC Lions players